This list of molluscs of the Houtman Abrolhos includes 492 species of marine molluscs which have been recorded from the waters of the Houtman Abrolhos, an island group in the Indian Ocean off the coast of Western Australia.

These molluscs are predominantly gastropods (346 species, 70%) and bivalves (124, 25%); the remaining 5% of species consist of cephalopods (14 species), chitons (5 species) and scaphopods (4 species).

About two thirds of the species have a tropical distribution, temperate species account for 20%, and the remaining 11% are endemic to Western Australia.

Gastropoda

Bivalvia

Cephalopoda

Spirulidae
Spirula spirula (Ram's horn squid)
Sepiidae
Sepia chirotrema
Sepia cultrata
Sepia irvingi
Sepia novaehollandiae
Sepia papuensis
Sepia apama (Australian giant cuttlefish)
Sepiadariidae
Sepioloidea lineolata
Sepiolidae
Euprymna tasmanica (Southern dumpling squid)
Loliginidae
Loligo chinensis
Sepioteuthis lessoniana
Octopodidae
Hapalochlaena cf. maculosa (Southern blue-ringed octopus)
Hapalochlaena lunulata (Greater blue-ringed octopus)
Octopus flindersi

Polyplacophora
Ischnochitonidae
 Ischnochiton cariosus
 Ischnochiton sp.
Cryptoplacidae
 Cryptoplax hartmeyeri
 Cryptoplax striata
Chitonidae
 Onithochiton quercina

Scaphopoda
Dentaliidae
 Dentalium elephantinum
 Dentalium formosum
 Dentalium bisexangulatum
Solecurtidae
 Solecurtus sulcatus

See also
 List of marine molluscs of Australia

References 

Houtman Abrolhos
Molluscs
Houtman Abrolhos
Molluscs of the Houtman Abrolhos
Houtman Abrolhos
Marine molluscs of Oceania